The Coromandel Volcanic Zone (CVZ) is an extinct intraplate volcanic arc stretching from Great Barrier Island in the north, through the Coromandel Peninsula, to the Kaimai Range in the south. The area of transition between it and the newer and still active Taupō Volcanic Zone is now usually separated and is called the Tauranga Volcanic Centre. Its volcanic activity was associated with the formation and most active period of the Hauraki Rift.

Geology

Tectonics
The Coromandel Volcanic Zone is generally older than the currently still active Hauraki and Taupō Rifts. This has implications as the widening of the Hauraki Rift was most about 5.5 million years ago, so the Kiwitahi volcanics, which occur west of the Coromandel Peninsula and the Hauraki Rift are probably best regarded as related to the Coromandel Volcanic Zone. For example some of the volcanics are broadly contemporaneous in age, composition and orientation north south, with eruptions at 16 million years ago at Stony Batter, Waiheke Island, however Stony  Batter has been active much more recently.
Thus the tectonic processes involved in the formation of the of the Hauraki Rift and Coromandel Volcanic Zone in the continent of Zealandia have moved from the north to the south over the last 20 million years. The Coromandel Volcanic Zone includes back arc volcanoes that are related to historic but distinct fault structures such as the Hauraki Fault which is along the eastern side of the zone. The undersea western side of the Coromandel Volcanic Zone has a parallel structure to the Hauraki basin and plains also of late Miocene/Quaternary origin extending north, that has been called the East Coromandel Rift. The formation of the Taupō Rift and the old Taupō Volcanic Zone about 2 million years ago terminated significant activity in the Coromandel Volcanic Zone but it is important to recognise that the Tauranga Volcanic Centre and its postulated Omanawa Caldera at the intersection of the two rifts, have likely relationships to the location of the more recent north eastern caldera's of the Taupō Volcanic Zone which will have buried any older volcanics that were related to the southern end of the Coromandel Volcanic Zone.

Volcanism
Activity began in the north around 18 million years ago, and was primarily andesitic in an intraplate volcanic arc until around 9–10 million years ago. The oldest volcanic rocks at the northern tip of the Coromandel Peninsula are the Port Charles andesites that are dated from about 18 million years ago. With time, the volcanism tended to move southwards at /year and eastwards at /year.  After this stage it is postulated that the Kapowai Caldera, the largest in the zone, located in the center of the Coromandel Range (peaks of Table mountain, The Pinnacles, Tanehua) formed. This is part of a rhyolitic transition that can be seen from Whitianga to Whangamatā on the western side of the zone but it is notable that some of the eastern Whitianga rhyolites are younger than some further south. In the period 9 to 7 million years ago a bimodal basalt to basaltic andesite/rhyolite association developed with major caldera collapse, ignimbrite eruptions, and then postcaldera andesite eruption. This included the Wharepapa Ignimbrite event from the Kapowai Caldera about 8 million years ago. To the south of the large Kapowai Caldera some  have located the smaller Wharekawa Caldera. The Tunaiti Caldera, immediately south of Whangamatā is believed to be about 7 million years old and has precaldera andesites and dacites, and later dacites and rhyolite domes and flows.  Then between 6 to 5.5 million years ago bimodal eruptions of basalt to basaltic andesite  as well as rhyolite and rhyolitic ignimbrite began once more. This formed the volcanic structures around Waihi later important in precious metal discoveries due to subsequent hydrothermal mineral deposit formation. As activity decreased between 4.7 to 4.2 million years ago it became entirely basaltic with the volcanics of the eastern Mercury Islands being typical before the transitioned into early activity in the Taupō Volcanic Zone. Some of the later activity in the Coromandel Volcanic Zone and its interface with the Taupō Volcanic Zone is obscured by subsequent large scale events but it continued in the south to at least 2.5 million years ago with the Bowentown rhyolitics south of Waihi Beach marking the transition to the Tauranga Volcanic Centre. The extinct undersea Colville Ridge, which has been dated to 5.4 million years before present is part of the Coromandel Volcanic Zone and can be associated with the modern Taupō Volcanic Zone and Kermadec Ridge.
Geothermal activity is still present in the Zone, with hot springs in several places, including at Hot Water Beach, on the central east coast between Whitianga and Tairua and on the south western margins of the Zone near Te Aroha where there is only natural soda water geyser in the world.
There are mineral deposits such as gold in quartz reefs associated with past geothermal and volcanic processes.

See also
Geology of the Auckland Region
Geology of the Waikato-King Country Region
List of volcanoes in New Zealand
Volcanism of New Zealand
Stratigraphy of New Zealand

References

Geography of Waikato
Landforms of Waikato
Volcanism of New Zealand
Geology of New Zealand
Volcanoes of Waikato
Thames-Coromandel District